Walter Padbury (22 December 1820 – 18 April 1907) was a British-born Australian pioneer, politician and philanthropist.

Early Life 
Padbury was born in Stonesfield in the English county of Oxfordshire on 22 December 1820. Padbury was left in the care of a married couple, who absconded with his inheritance, leaving Padbury as a homeless orphan. He held multiple occupations in an attempt to support himself, including shepherding near York for a £10 salary at the age of 16. By 1863, Padbury had saved enough money to arrange for his mother and other family members to immigrate to Australia, becoming one of the first settlers in North West Australia, squatting on the territory of the indigenous Nyamal people surrounding the De Grey River. This venture failed after several years.

Career 
Despite his prior business failure, he remained interested in the North West. Later in life he found success in his ownership of a profitable flour-mill at Guildford. He was a committed member of the Royal Agricultural Society of Western Australia, serving as president from 1874 to 1876 and again in 1885. With the capital and stability afforded to him from his successful businesses, including a line of general stores, he often donated to charitable institutions and financially supported the endeavours of his extended family.

He had a long political career as well, serving as a member of the Perth City Council, chairman of the Guildford Municipal Council, and the member for Swan in the Western Australian Legislative Council from 1872 until his resignation in 1877.

Death and legacy 
He died in Perth on 18 April 1907 at the age of 87. His wife, Charlotte, had died earlier in February 1895.

Padbury's will continued his philanthropy, leaving large sums of his money to multiple charitable institutions including the Waifs Home at Parkerville and the Swan Boys Orphanage.

The northern Perth suburb of Padbury was named for him in 1971.

See also
 Padbury Buildings – Former development in Perth with a nearby plaque dedicated to him in 1990
 Thornlie, Western Australia – Suburb of Perth beginning as a farm owned by his niece and financed by Padbury.

Notes

References

Cara Cammilleri, 'Padbury, Walter (1820 - 1907)', Australian Dictionary of Biography, Volume 5, MUP, 1974, pp 388–389.

1820 births
1907 deaths
People from Perth, Western Australia
English emigrants to Australia
Settlers of Western Australia
People from West Oxfordshire District
19th-century Australian philanthropists
19th-century squatters